You Wouldn't Know may refer to:
 You Wouldn't Know (Hellyeah song), 2007
 You Wouldn't Know (Bee Gees song), 1965
 You Wouldn't Know (Chokamkuru Langneh song), 2021